The Grand Moments (French: Les Grands Moments) is a French film directed by Claude Lelouch in 1965.

Details
 Title : The Grand Moments
 Director: Claude Lelouch
 Photography : Jean Collomb
 Producers: Films 13, Films de la Pléiade
 Scenery : Robert Luchaire
 Format : 2,35:1 (Franscope) - Mono - 35 mm
 Release date : 1965

Starring
Amidou : Roger Amy
Pierre Barouh : Karl Martin
Jean-Pierre Kalfon : Jean Mafitte
Janine Magnan : Janine
Jacques Portet : Jacques Framm

About the film 
After four attempts to destroy the negatives, Claude Lelouch eventually succeeded in 1964, within fifteen days of the success of Une fille et des fusils. Les Grands Moments was a parody of the James Bond style of the period, but the film never found a distributor, and Lelouch thought the film was so bad that he attempted to destroy the negatives of the film, so that it would never be shown. Lelouch then drove all night, stopping only in Deauville, where he saw a couple on a beach, who gave him the idea for a film, that went on to become A Man and a Woman.
Janine Magnan was the partner of Lelouch at the time.

External links 

French comedy films
1965 films
Films directed by Claude Lelouch
1960s French films